"Sugar Walls" is the second single from Sheena Easton's 1984 album A Private Heaven. It spent 16 weeks on the Billboard Hot 100 in the United States, nine of which were in the top 40. It reached number 9 on the Hot 100, number 3 on the R&B chart and number 1 on the Dance chart. The song did not chart in Easton's native UK. The music was credited to Alexander Nevermind, a pseudonym used by Prince. 

"Sugar Walls" was given a special release on 13 April 2019, as a 12-inch single picture disc pressing by RT Industries (Razor & Tie), for 2019 National Record Store Day.

Background
The song title is presumed to be a euphemism for the lining of a vagina, and the general content was considered suggestive enough to qualify the song for the "Filthy Fifteen". Although Easton's music video for "Sugar Walls" did not in itself feature any controversial visual content, some broadcasters refused the video airplay because of the sexual imagery of the song's lyrics. Televangelist Jimmy Swaggart and Tipper Gore's PMRC criticized the song when it was first released.

Charts

Weekly charts

Year-end charts

Popular culture
The song is known for being covered by Rachel Lester during her infamous audition on the fourth series of The X Factor in 2007.

See also
List of number-one dance singles of 1985 (U.S.)

References

External links
 

1985 singles
Sheena Easton songs
Songs written by Prince (musician)
Obscenity controversies in music
1984 songs
EMI Records singles